Badii Devrani is an Indian television show that aired on &TV from 30 March 2015 to 13 November 2015. It was the story of an unusual union between an older woman, Reeti, and a younger man, Vibhor, even though their families are bitter enemies.

Plot

For business reasons, Reeti is promised to Vibhor, five years her junior and the youngest of the Poddar sons. Reeti, who is well-educated, projects a progressive mindset towards life. The show engages the viewer in the question of whether or not Reeti will be able to strike a balance and secure a place for herself in the Poddar family, and in Vibhor's heart, given the uneasy circumstances under which they get married. The setting of the story is a traditional Marwari family, with most of the themes presenting fundamental relationships and togetherness.

On a business trip, the Poddar men, including Vibhor, meet with a fatal accident and die leaving their wives to mourn their deaths.

Politically powerful Kadambari Mehta vows to destroy the Poddar family and succeeds. She tricks Reeti into marrying her son Moksh Mehta who is mentally challenged. Reeti is mistreated by the Mehtas but strikes a friendly relationship with Moksh. She discovers hidden secrets in the Mehta family and exposes Moksh's sister, Siddhi, as the culprit. It is revealed that Siddhi was siphoning off funds from a family run NGO and when her father threatened to report her to the police, she killed him and buried his body. However, this is witnessed by Moksh who then meets with an accident and loses his memory. Siddhi starts giving Moksh the wrong medicines so he would remain mentally challenged. Though at first Reeti thinks Kadambari may have killed her husband, she eventually exposes Siddhi who is sent to prison. Kadambari apologizes for her past actions and accepts Reeti as her daughter-in-law.

Under the right care, Moksh slowly recovers and starts going to office as he and his family live happily.

Cast
 Mudit Nayar as Vibhor, Reeti's husband and the youngest Poddar son
 Megha Chakraborty as Reeti
Sudhir Dalvi as Dadaji / Hanuman Poddar, patriarch of the Poddar family, Vibhor's grandfather
 Vanya Joshi as Dadiji, Vibhor's grandmother
Reena Kapoor as Prabha Poddar, Vibhor's mother
Roshani Shetty as Manbhari, Prabha's sister and Vibhor's biological mother
 Kajol Srivastav as Megha, Prabha's daughter
Raju Shrestha as Swaroop Chand, Manbhari's husband
Daya Shankar Pandey as Bilasi Poddar, Vibhor's uncle
Jyoti Gauba as Kaushalaya Poddar, Bilasi's wife
Ankit Vyas as Nikunj Poddar, Bilasi's son
Priyanka Singh as Kajal Poddar, Nikunj's wife
Shubhi Ahuja as Manisha Poddar
Chetan Pandit as Sitaram Biyani, Reeti's father
Navni Parihar as Indira Biyani, Reeti's mother
Ekroop Bedi as Reeti's younger sister 
 Aamir Dalvi as Moksh Mehta, Reeti's second husband
 Alok Narula as Rohan Mehta, Moksh's brother
 Anjali Abrol as Siddhi Mehta, Moksh's sister
Kamalika Guha Thakurta as Moksh Mother

References

External links

Indian comedy television series
Hindi-language television shows
&TV original programming
2015 Indian television series debuts
2015 Indian television series endings
Shashi Sumeet Productions series
Television shows set in Kolkata